Sue City is an unincorporated community in Macon County, in the U.S. state of Missouri.

History
Sue City was platted in 1868, and named after Susan Ryster, the wife of a first settler. A post office called Sue City was established in 1868, and remained in operation until 1900.

References

Unincorporated communities in Macon County, Missouri
Unincorporated communities in Missouri